Carlos Berlocq and Brian Dabul became the first champions of this tournament. They defeated Andrés Molteni and Guido Pella 7–6(4), 6–3 in the final.

Seeds

Draw

Draw

External links
 Main Draw

Copa Topper - Doubles
2010 Doubles